The Longcut are an English rock band, formed in 2002 in Manchester.

Career
The Longcut formed in Manchester in 2002, while attending the University of Manchester. Originally a four-piece, their vocalist left soon after the band started and the remaining members intended to make purely instrumental music. In 2003 their experiments with cheap drum machines led to a new sound and their unusual stage setup. The band's original sound and energetic live performances brought them to the attention of the record industry in 2004, eventually signing to Liverpool's Deltasonic label. During 2004 the band also became friends with Manchester promoters Akoustik Anarkhy and indie/grunge band, Nine Black Alps. The two groups shared bills together at various house parties (one in Longsight was filmed for the video to "Transition") organised by Akoustik Anarkhy and The Longcut, eventually touring together in early 2006.

The Longcut released their debut EP Transition in November 2004, followed by A Quiet Life in June 2005. Both EPs sold out and were well received by the music press. The band continued to tour throughout 2005, including appearances at SXSW, Glastonbury Festival and Fuji Rock Festival. Work on their debut album, A Call and Response, began in the summer of 2005. Production duties were handled by Jonny Dollar, and was mixed by TV on the Radio's David Andrew Sitek. A mini-album (a compilation of their UK EPs) was released internationally in 2006. 

A Call and Response was released on 12 June 2006, followed by "Vitamin C" as a lead promotional single. "A Tried and Tested Method" would soon follow, and continued to attract album sales, released on 2 October. The single received more media coverage than any of their other releases to date, with the video being played frequently on a lot of the UK music channels. After A Call and Response the band released The Airtight Sessions EP, a compilation of the band's previous work and one new song "Idiot Check" making up the four-track listing. The EP was made available as a free download for all subscribers to the band's official site for a limited time, then made available for purchase at Apple Computer's iTunes Store.

The next release by the band was a 7-inch single on the Melodic Records label, on 19 March 2007.  Limited to 500 copies, the double A-side featured "Idiot Check" (recorded at the sessions for A Call and Response) and a cover of the Candi Staton rave track "You Got the Love".

Their second album, Open Hearts, was produced by Nine Black Alps guitarist David Jones. It was released by Melodic Records as a download in June 2009, then on CD and LP in October. It was followed in 2010 by an EP, Broken Hearts, consisting of remixes of songs from the album.

The band returned in 2018 with their third album, entitled Arrows.

Members
 Stuart Ogilvie - vocals, keyboard, drums
 Lee Gale - guitar
 Jon Fearon - bass

Discography

Studio albums
A Call and Response 12 June 2006 (UK)
Open Hearts 6 June 2009 (UK)
Arrows 20 April 2018 (UK)

Singles and EPs
November 2004 - Transition - Limited edition EP, not chart eligible.
April 2005 - A Quiet Life - Limited edition EP, not chart eligible.
November 2005 - The Longcut - 5 track Japanese EP.
Various release dates, 2006 - The Longcut - 6 track international mini-album.
July 2006 - "Vitamin C" - Download & 12-inch Vinyl single.
August 2006 - Airtight / Idiot Check EP - 4 track download only live EP.
October 2006 - "A Tried & Tested Method" - Download, CD & coloured vinyl single.
March 2007 - "Idiot Check" / "You Got The Love" - Limited 7-inch and download.
2010 - Broken Hearts - 7 track EP.

References

External links
Official website
The Longcut's Myspace site
Melodic - label site

English indie rock groups
Musical groups established in 2002
Musical groups from Manchester
Alumni of the University of Manchester
Deltasonic Records artists